Latta is an unincorporated community and census-designated place in Pontotoc County, Oklahoma, United States. Its population was 1,172 as of 2016. Oklahoma State Highway 1 passes through the community.

Geography

Demographics

References

Unincorporated communities in Pontotoc County, Oklahoma
Unincorporated communities in Oklahoma
Census-designated places in Pontotoc County, Oklahoma
Census-designated places in Oklahoma